The 84th Punjabis was an infantry regiment of the British Indian Army. It was raised by Captain Donald Macdonald at Vellore on 12 August 1794, as the 34th Battalion of Madras Native Infantry. It was designated as the 84th Punjabis in 1903 and became the 10th (Training) Battalion, 1st Punjab Regiment in 1922. In 1943, it was converted into the 1st Punjab Regimental Centre. In 1947, the 1st Punjab Regiment was allocated to the Pakistan Army. In 1956, the 1st, 14th, 15th and 16th Punjab Regimental Centres where amalgamated to form the Punjab Regimental Centre.

Early history
The regiment had its antecedents in the old Madras Army of the British East India Company, which was largely responsible for the British conquest of south and central India. It was raised at Vellore in August 1794, as the 34th Madras Battalion. The regiment's first action was during the Fourth Anglo-Mysore War near Mallavelly on 27 March 1799. On 4 May, it fought in the Battle of Seringapatam, where Tipu Sultan made his last stand. The regiment's next major action was in the Second Maratha War, where it fought in the Battle of Assaye on 3 September 1803, under General Arthur Wellesley, the future Duke of Wellington. The regiment's  performance was much appreciated during the day's fierce fighting, where it suffered 228 casualties. As a reward, it was permitted to display the word "Assaye" with the device of an elephant on their colours and appointments. In 1810, it took part in the expeditions to Bourbon Island and Mauritius in the Indian Ocean. It was again engaged against the Marathas during the Third Maratha War of 1817–19, which decisively broke the Maratha power in India. In the latter part of the 19th century, the regiment did not see much action, although it saw active service in Burma.

84th Punjabis
In 1902, the regiment, now designated as the 24th Madras Infantry, was reconstituted with Punjabi Muslims, Sikhs and Rajputs. Next year, as a result of the reforms brought about in the Indian Army by Lord Kitchener, all Madras units had 60 added to their numbers, and the regiment's designation was changed to 84th Punjabis. During the first three years of the First World War, the 84th Punjabis remained deployed on the North West Frontier of India. In March 1917, they were dispatched to Mesopotamia, where it operated on the Euphrates Line. By now, the Turkish Army in Mesopotamia had been largely defeated and the regiment did not see any significant fighting. In November 1918, it moved to Salonika in Greece and then six weeks later to the Russian Transcaucasia in support of the White Russian forces fighting the Bolsheviks. After spending 1919–20 in Turkey as part of the Allied occupation forces, it returned home in October 1920.

Subsequent history
After the First World War, the	84th Punjabis were grouped with the 62nd, 66th, 76th and 82nd Punjabis, and the 1st Brahmans to form the 1st Punjab Regiment in 1922. The battalion was redesignated as 10th Battalion, 1st Punjab Regiment and became the Training Battalion of the regiment, based at Jhelum. During the Second World War, 10/1st Punjab was converted into the 1st Punjab Regimental Centre. In 1947, the 1st Punjab Regiment was allocated to Pakistan Army, and in 1956, it was merged with the 14th, 15th and 16th Punjab Regiments to form one large Punjab Regiment. The 1st Punjab Regimental Centre was merged with the 14th, 15th and 16th Punjab Regimental Centres to form the Punjab Regimental Centre. It is based at Mardan.

Lineage

1794: 34th Battalion of Madras Native Infantry
1797: 2nd Battalion 12th Regiment of Madras Native Infantry
1824: 24th Regiment of Madras Native Infantry
1885: 24th Regiment of Madras Infantry
1901: 24th Madras Infantry
1903: 84th Punjabis
1922: 10th (Training) Battalion 1st Punjab Regiment
1942: 10/1st Punjab Regimental Training Centre
1943: 1st Punjab Regimental Centre
1956: Punjab Regimental Centre

See also
1st Punjab Regiment
Punjab Regiment

References

Further reading
Qureshi, Maj MI. (1958). The First Punjabis: History of the First Punjab Regiment 1759–1956. Aldershot: Gale & Polden.
Wilson, Lt Col WJ. (1882–88). History of the Madras Army. Madras: The Government Press.
Phythian-Adams, Lt Col EG. (1943). Madras Infantry 1748–1943. Madras: The Government Press.
Rizvi, Brig SHA. (1984). Veteran Campaigners – A History of the Punjab Regiment 1759–1981. Lahore: Wajidalis.

 

British Indian Army infantry regiments
Punjab Regiment (Pakistan)
Military history of the Madras Presidency
Military units and formations established in 1794
Indian World War I regiments
Military units and formations disestablished in 1922
1794 establishments in British India